Seven Days That Shook the Spice Girls is a 2002 unofficial British documentary film about British girl group the Spice Girls. The film looks at seven key moments in the band's history, including their formation, Top of the Pops magazine giving them their nicknames, firing their manager Simon Fuller and Geri Halliwell's departure.

Release 
The film premiered on Channel 4 on 10 September 2002, and was watched by an audience of 2.08 million.

Critical response 
Writing for The Guardian, Gareth McLean thought the film was "lightweight and disposable", and did not do the "bona fide pop culture phenomenon" of the Spice Girls justice. Joe Joseph of The Times agreed that the film was insubstantial, calling it a "speedy, cost-efficient way to interleave stock library footage with quotes from DJs and showbiz journalists in order to fill gaps in the late summer schedules." The Independents Thomas Sutcliffe felt the airing of the film on the same week as the first anniversary of the September 11 attacks was ill-timed, and described the film as "a scrappy collage of warmed-over gossip and underpowered revelation."

See also
 Spice Girls filmography

References

External links

2002 television films
2002 films
British documentary films
Works about the Spice Girls
Documentary films about entertainers
2002 documentary films
Documentary films about women
2000s British films